Novosphingobium aromaticivorans is a species of bacteria. It is an aromatic compound-degrading bacteria,  it is gram-negative, non-spore-forming, non-motile and rod-shaped. It is found in deep-terrestrial-subsurface sediments.

References

Further reading

External links

LPSN

Sphingomonadales
Bacteria described in 1997